The men's triple jump at the 2019 Asian Athletics Championships was held on 21 and 22 April.

Medalists

Results

Qualification
Qualification rule:  Qualifying performance 16.50 (Q) or at least 12 best performers (q) qualify for the final

Final

References

Triple
Triple jump at the Asian Athletics Championships